Joyce Leopoldo Conde Chigne (born 8 September 1991 in Cajamarca, Peru) is a  Peruvian footballer who plays as a center forward.

Club career 
In 2008 Conde played for the U-20 Universitario de Deportes squad. In 2009, he was promoted to the first team and made his debut on 9 May 2009 at home against Sport Huancayo, which Universitario de Deportes won 4-1.

References

External links
 
 

1991 births
Living people
Footballers from Lima
Association football forwards
Peruvian footballers
Club Universitario de Deportes footballers
Club Deportivo Universidad César Vallejo footballers